Dahongmen may refer to:

 Dahongmen Subdistrict, Beijing
 Dahongmen Station, Beijing Subway